Stahlstown is a small unincorporated community in Cook Township, Westmoreland County, Pennsylvania, United States. It is 50 miles south of Pittsburgh, just a few miles from the Donegal exit on the Pennsylvania Turnpike, located at the intersection of route 711 and route 130.

History 
The village was originally known as Centerville, but the name was changed after the Post Office objected there already being a town of Centerville nearby across Laurel Hill in Somerset County. It was then decided to name the town Stahlstown after Leonard Stahl (b. 1734 – d. Nov.1829) upon whose land the village was built. Leonard Stahl was married to Elizabeth King (daughter of Michael and Susanna [Passmore] King of Somerset County). Elizabeth's brother William King (b. Nov 23, 1776 – d. May 5, 1853) was also instrumental in the founding of Stahlstown along with another brother, Enos King (b. Oct 28, 1768  – d. Aug 15, 1845), who built the first house in the village near the intersection of route 711 and route 130. The house was built of stone around the year 1799 and in 1882 was occupied by John Roadman (b. March 1821 – d. Mar 29, 1902), son of Jacob and Ann (King) Roadman. Ann King was William's oldest child. The house is still occupied today.

At one time the small village had as many as three gas stations, a general store, a pub, post office, firehouse, and a Nickelodeon movie theater.  The Stahlstown Flax Scutching Grounds is home to the nations second oldest continued Flax Scutching Festival , held annually in the month of September.  A popular event for locals and tourists is the "Indian Raid" which is a historical recreation of a typical gun battle between Native American's and American pioneer's that culminates with the burning of mock cabin and ends in a smoky gun battle.  In 2007, the festival celebrated its 100th anniversary.

According to the Chestnut Ridge Historical Society, a farmhouse just outside Stahlstown was used during World War II by the German American Bund as the headquarters to the largest German spy ring in the eastern United States, with connecting offices in Chicago and New York.  Residents of the farmhouse were directly on Adolf Hitler's payroll and used the facility to direct and gather information, and place workers in factories, shipyards and even the armed forces.   After the war, Hitler planned to build a house in woods of Pennsylvania because of its resemblance to the Black Forest of southwest Germany.

In the 1980s and 1990s Stahlstown was home to North America's only importer for Bimota motorcycles from Rimini, Italy.  This exotic sport bike would attract customers from all over the country, including celebrities like Jay Leno.

During the second week of July the Chestnut Ridge Community Volunteer Fire Company hosts a week-long fair complete with amusement rides, entertainment, a parade and a Saturday evening display of Zambelli Fireworks.

A unique aspect to the small village, State Route 130 is the division between Mount Pleasant Area School District and Ligonier Valley School District.   This has allowed some parents a "gray area" as to which school district they are to send their children.

A private, executive golf course was built in 2017 by Timothy E. Pisula. The course operates as a secondary practice facility for the Mount Pleasant Area Golf Team and former members. The course also hosts the annual Par 3 Classic tournament. Today, the course is maintained and operated by the Pisula family.

Additional references taken from "History of the County of Westmoreland, Pennsylvania, with biographical sketches of many of its prominent men." Edited by George Dallas Albert; pub 1882 by L. H. Everts & Co, Philadelphia and the cemetery records of the Stahlstown Methodist Church Cemetery.

References

Unincorporated communities in Westmoreland County, Pennsylvania